Huang Bokai (Chinese: 黄博凯; born 26 September 1996) is a Chinese athlete specialising in the pole vault. He represented his country at the 2016 Summer Olympics without qualifying for the final.

His personal bests in the event are 5.75 metres outdoors (Doha 2019) and 5.75 metres indoors (Doha 2016).

International competitions

References

1996 births
Living people
Chinese male pole vaulters
Athletes (track and field) at the 2016 Summer Olympics
Olympic athletes of China
Athletes (track and field) at the 2020 Summer Olympics